HCY may refer to:
 Central Hospital of Yaoundé, in Cameroon
 Helios Airways, a defunct Cypriot airline
 Homocysteine
 Tsuen Wan Public Ho Chuen Yiu Memorial College, a secondary school in Tsuen Wan, Hong Kong.